Sunny Again Tomorrow is a 2018 South Korean television series starring Seol In-ah, Jin Ju-hyung, Ha Seung-ri, and Lee Chang-wook. The series airs daily on KBS1 from 8:25 p.m. to 9:00 p.m. (KST) starting from May 7, 2018.

Cast

Main
 Seol In-ah as Kang Ha-nee  
 Jin Ju-hyung as Lee Han-kyul
 Ha Seung-ri as Hwang Ji-eun
 Lee Chang-wook as Park Do-kyung

Supporting

People around Ha-nee
 Yoon Bok-in as Lim Eun-ae
  as Kang Sa-rang

People around Ji-eun
  as Madam Moon 
 Shim Hye-jin as Yoon Jin-hee 
  as Yoon Seon-hee
 Kim Myung-soo as Hwang Dong-seok
 Kim Tae-min as Hwang Ji-hoo

People around Han-kyul
 Seo Hyun-chul as Lee Sang-hoon 
  as Kim So-hyun 
 Baek Seung-hee as Lee Han-na  
 Robin Deiana as Leo

People around Do-kyung
 Choi Jae-sung as Park Jin-guk

Cameo
 Hong Ah-reum as fake Han Soo-jung/Choi Yoo-ra
 Lee Yong-yi as Hwang Dong-seok's mother

Original soundtrack

Part 1

Part 2

Part 3

Part 4

Part 5

Part 6

Part 7

Part 8

Part 9

Part 10

Part 11

Part 12

Part 13

Part 14

Part 15

Part 16

Part 17

Part 18

Part 19

Part 20

Part 21

Part 22

Part 23

Part 24

Part 25

Part 26

Part 27

Part 28

Part 29

Part 30

Viewership
In this table,  represent the lowest ratings and  represent the highest ratings.
N/A denotes that the rating is not known.
TNmS stop publishing their report from June 2018.

Awards and nominations

Notes

References

External links
  
 

Korean Broadcasting System television dramas
2018 South Korean television series debuts
Korean-language television shows
South Korean melodrama television series
2018 South Korean television series endings